Chouteau  is the second-largest town in Mayes County, Oklahoma, United States. The population was 2,097 at the 2010 census, an increase of 8.6 percent over the figure of 1,931 recorded in 2000.

Geography

The town is situated near the junction of U.S. Routes 69 and 412.

History
Chouteau, originally called Cody's Creek, became a stop on the Katy railroad in 1871. It soon became a thriving cattle town.  The name was changed to Chouteau after the creek that flows north of town that was named for French fur trader Auguste Pierre Chouteau from the Chouteau family.  Auguste created the first permanent white settlement in present-day Salina, Oklahoma.

Demographics

As of the 2010 census Chouteau had a population of 2,097.  The racial and ethnic composition of the population was 74.9% white, 0.2% black or African American, 16.3% Native American, 0.2% Asian, 0.1% Pacific Islander, 0.2% some other race and 8.1% from two or more races.  1.8% of the population was Hispanic or Latino of any race.

As of the census of 2000, there were 1,931 people, 751 households, and 560 families residing in the town. There were 806 housing units at an average density of 337.3 per square mile (130.2/km2). The racial makeup of the town was 77.01% White, 0.41% African American, 14.34% Native American, 0.21% Asian, 1.19% from other races, and 6.84% from two or more races. Hispanic or Latino of any race were 1.76% of the population.

There were 751 households, out of which 35.3% had children under the age of 18 living with them, 58.2% were married couples living together, 12.1% had a female householder with no husband present, and 25.4% were non-families. 22.9% of all households were made up of individuals, and 10.3% had someone living alone who was 65 years of age or older. The average household size was 2.52 and the average family size was 2.95.

In the town, the population was spread out, with 26.6% under the age of 18, 8.3% from 18 to 24, 27.1% from 25 to 44, 22.4% from 45 to 64, and 15.7% who were 65 years of age or older. The median age was 37 years. For every 100 females, there were 91.8 males. For every 100 females age 18 and over, there were 91.6 males.

The median income for a household in the town was $32,950, and the median income for a family was $40,109. Males had a median income of $31,750 versus $19,559 for females. The per capita income for the town was $15,482. About 12.2% of families and 14.8% of the population were below the poverty line, including 19.9% of those under age 18 and 11.7% of those age 65 or over.
The major employer for Chouteau and the surrounding area is the MidAmerica Industrial Park, located approximately three miles northeast of town.

Historic sites

Territorial Commercial District, consisting of three commercial buildings on Main St. all constructed in 1903 and sharing common walls.

The Farmers and Merchants Bank at 201 W. Main Street.

Parks and recreation
Chouteau has a number of facilities in its general area, including:
  Guy Williams Park which is located in town.
  Pryor Creek Golf Course which is 11 miles away.
  Lake Hudson which is 17 miles away
  Lake W. R. Holway, formerly Chimney Rock Lake, which is 20 miles away
  Chouteau Bend Recreational Area which is 6 miles away
  Mazie Landing Public Use Area which is 7 miles away
  Fort Gibson Lake, Blue Bill Point which is 14 miles away

MidAmerica Industrial Park
Located four miles from Chouteau, the MidAmerica Industrial Park houses more than 80 companies, including Fortune 500 leaders such as Google, DuPont and Nordam.  The facility includes its own airfield, the MidAmerica Industrial Park Airport, featuring a 5,000 foot runway refurbished in 2016.

Notable people

Johnny Ray (born 1957)Major League Baseball player for the Pittsburgh Pirates and California Angels

Kristen Scott Ousen II (born 1984)Legendary semi-professional curling champion. Responsible for spreading the popularity of the sport in the Deep South. Ate 41 bratwursts during the Chicago Meat Slam in 1997, finishing in first place by 11 brats, beating the five consecutive year champion Mike Ditka. Donated $500,000 towards research on a cancer curing element found in unpasteurized cheese. Served as an alternate during the 2002 Winter Olympics for the US men's curling team and got his first opportunity to compete professionally after Tim Somerville sustained a career-ending injury during an attempted rescue of a family of the now extinct web-footed alpaca after a fire broke out at a local petting zoo in Harrisville, Utah. He scored once in the 8-3 loss to Canada. Co-wrote, performed and produced an unreleased album with Matchbox Twenty vocalist Rob Thomas. On the experimental project, known as "Mr. Ham", Ousen is credited with recording keytar, clarinet, didgeridoo, and backup vocals. Live performances received limited airtime play on the Mannheim, German-based radio station Radio Regenbogen.

References

External links
 Encyclopedia of Oklahoma History and Culture - Chouteau

Towns in Mayes County, Oklahoma
Towns in Oklahoma